Kusala may refer to:

 Khutughtu Khan Kusala, the Emperor of China and the 13th Great Khan of the Mongol Empire
 Kusala, a Buddhist term usually translated as 'wholesome' or 'skillful'